F.C. Kafr Qasim (Moadon Sport Kafr Qasim, lit. Kafr Qasim Sport Club; or in short , Mem Samekh Kafr Qasim, lit. S.C. Kafr Qasim) is an Israeli football club based in Kafr Qasim. The club currently plays in Liga Leumit, they play home matches at the Lod Municipal Stadium in Lod.

History
The club was formed in 2002 by a merger of two city rivals from Kafr Qasim, Hapoel Kafr Qasim and Maccabi Kafr Qasim. In the new club's first season, they won the 2002–03 Liga Bet South A division, and were promoted to Liga Alef, where they spent three seasons, up until relegation in the 2005–06 season.

In the 2012–13 season, the club finished runners-up in Liga Bet South A division and qualified to the promotion play-offs. After four successful promotion play-offs matches against F.C. Bnei Jaffa Ortodoxim, Hapoel Bik'at HaYarden, F.C. Shikun HaMizrah and Hapoel Arad, the club won promotion to Liga Alef, exactly ten years after they did so in the previous time.

Kafr Qasim finished the 2013–14 season in Liga Alef South in the sixth place, four points short of the promotion play-offs.

In the two consecutive seasons 2015-2016 and 2016-2017 in Liga Alef FC. Kafr Qasim reached the Final game of the Promotion playoffs to the Liga Leumit against 14th Place sides from Liga Leumit, but failed to win promotion in both cases.

They were promoted to the second division Liga Leumit in 2019 automatically from 1st place of Liga Alef South.

Stadium
During the second decade of the twentieth century the club played in different stadiums like Lod Municipal Stadium and Winter Stadium.

These days, Kfar Qassem Football Stadium undergoing renovations and will contain 8,000 seats.

Current squad
 As to 29 January 2023

Honours

League

1Achieved by Hapoel Kafr Qasim

External links
Kafr Qasim Sport Club Israel Football Association

References

Football clubs in Israel
Association football clubs established in 2002
2002 establishments in Israel
Arab-Israeli football clubs